Karksi is a village in Mulgi Parish in Viljandi County in southern Estonia. It is located near the town Karksi-Nuia.

See also
Battle of Karksi (1600)

References

External links
Maps, Weather, and Airports for Karksi, Estonia - Global Gazetteer Version 2.1

Villages in Viljandi County
Castles of the Teutonic Knights
Kreis Pernau